Ellerman is a lunar impact crater on the far side of the Moon. It lies within the outer blanket of ejecta that surrounds the Mare Orientale impact basin, and is located to the west of the Montes Cordillera mountain range. To the northwest of Ellerman is the larger crater Gerasimovich.

Probably due to its location amidst rugged surroundings, the otherwise circular rim of this crater is somewhat irregular and polygonal in shape. The loose material along the inner walls has slid down to form a ring of talus around the base, leaving walls that slope straight down with no terraces. There is a small crater along the northern rim top.

References

 
 
 
 
 
 
 
 
 
 
 
 

Impact craters on the Moon